Lady Thetis was a Cypriot passenger ship sunk for use as a recreational dive site in the Mediterranean Sea off Limassol, Cyprus.

She used to be named Reiher and was employed as a coastal passenger vessel. She was built in Hamburg, West Germany, in 1953 and was registered in the Register of Cyprus Ships in 1990.

Lady Thetis was sunk off Limassol in February 2014 along with the fishing vessel Constandis to serve as a recreational dive site. Lady Thetis lies in approximately 18 meters (59 feet) of water and has a number of easy swim-throughs and penetration options for divers who are more adventurous. Due to the way the wreck hit and has dug into the seafloor, a deeper depth than the seabed can be achieved inside the wreck close to the keel. A decompression trapeze can be found at the stern of the wreck at 5 meters (16.5 feet), 30 to 40 meters (98 to 131 feet) from the wreck buoy.

Dive site
Access: Whilst close to the marina adjacent to the Crowne Plaza Hotel, a vessel is required to complete the transit to the site. 
 Expected depth: 20 m (66 ft)
 Bottom characteristics: Sandy/Silty
 Max depth in area: <30m (98 ft)
 Alternate site: Three stars/Paphos/Latchi
Particular risks:
 Traffic protection - High 
 Narcosis - Low
 Decompression - Moderate
 Increased air consumption - High
 Limited time - Low
 Poor visibility - Moderate
 Separation - High
 Entanglement - Moderate
 Entrapment and sharps – High
 Dehydration/Sun burn/Exposure – High
 Penetration - Low

References

Ships built in Hamburg
1953 ships
Shipwrecks in the Mediterranean Sea
Ships_sunk_as_dive_sites
Maritime incidents in 2014